Miller's Store, also known as Trent House and General Store and Trenthouse Inn and Country Store, is a historic commercial building located at Trent in Middlecreek Township, Somerset County, Pennsylvania.  It was built in 1885, and expanded about 1895.  It is a large, 2 1/2-story, "U"-shaped, Queen Anne style building designed to house a general store, post office, and hotel. On the corner of the front facade is a two-story, hexagonal tower with a faceted conical roof and copper finial.  It features a wraparound porch.

It was added to the National Register of Historic Places in 1992.

References

External links
Trenthouse Inn website

Commercial buildings on the National Register of Historic Places in Pennsylvania
Queen Anne architecture in Pennsylvania
Commercial buildings completed in 1895
Buildings and structures in Somerset County, Pennsylvania
National Register of Historic Places in Somerset County, Pennsylvania